"Should We Tell Him" is a song released in 1958 by The Everly Brothers. The song reached No. 10 on the Billboard survey of "Most Played C&W by Jockeys". As the B-side of "This Little Girl of Mine", the single reached No. 26 on the Billboard survey of "Best Sellers in Stores" and No. 4 on the Billboard survey of "C&W Best Sellers in Stores".

Chart performance

References

1957 songs
1958 singles
The Everly Brothers songs
Songs written by Don Everly
Songs written by Phil Everly
Cadence Records singles